Back in Business is a 1997 action thriller film starring Brian Bosworth and Joe Torry.  The film revolves around two policemen, Joe Elkhart (Bosworth) and Tony Dunbar (Torry) and their pursuit of drug runners and dirty cops. Bosworth's character is an environmentalist, similar to Steven Seagal's character in "Fire Down Below."

Cast
 Brian Bosworth as Joe Elkhart
 Joe Torry as Tony Dunbar
 Dara Tomanovich as Natalie Walker
 Alan Scarfe as David Ashby
 Aubrey Beavers as Remy
 Brion James as Emery Ryker
 Aleks Shaklin as Hank Berdsall
 Victoria Mahoney as Java

German release
The film was released in Germany under the title Heart of Stone in May 1997. The German VHS release changed the title to Stone Cold 2 and marketed it as a sequel to Brian Bosworth's 1991 debut film Stone Cold, including a picture of Bosworth from the VHS cover for that film. The later German DVD release used the same artwork.

Reception 
Critical reception for Back in Business has been negative. Empire Magazine felt that "Not very exciting, not very funny and hardly likely to promote either of its stars out of the low-rent sector, it cruises along like a very old car, you know it'll get to where it's going in the end but you don't want to go along for the ride."

TV Guide criticized the film, writing that "Although the film gets some mileage out of the running gag about our hero's attempts to control his temper by speaking to a talk-radio psychiatrist, the film's false starts and detours are best exemplified by Bosworth's "Dukes of Hazzard"-like interplay with Torry. Trying way too hard to divert, BACK IN BUSINESS falls prey to extraneous explosions and lame comic relief." Entertainment Weekly rated the movie a C-, stating that Bosworth's " fledgling charisma can’t save this clanking thriller".

References

External links
 
 
 

American action thriller films
1997 action thriller films
1997 films
1990s English-language films
Films directed by Philippe Mora
1990s American films